North Poole may refer to:

 The northern areas of Poole, a town in Dorset, England
 Mid Dorset and North Poole (UK Parliament constituency)

See also 
 North Pool, a small, shallow pond near the North Pole
 North Pole (disambiguation)